The Ogbomosho Sons and Daughters in North America, Inc. (or simply OSDNA) was created in 1996 as an umbrella organization for persons in Diaspora, who are natives of the City of Ogbomosho, Nigeria. The OSDNA is a non-profit 501 (c)(3) volunteer organization whose main purpose or goal is that of “developing Ogbomosho land and helping its people”.

History

Ogbomosho natives have long been known as avid travelers. As a result of having so many people in Diaspora, Ogbomosho natives, especially those living in North America, felt the need to “give back”, in order to help alleviate to some extent the impact of brain drain on the city, since so many of them tend to be working age persons, who left to look for jobs elsewhere. Brain drain (the emigration of working age and usually educated persons from a location) tends to be a big problem for developing countries, where jobs are scarce for new graduates. Therefore, any help that can be given back by such emigrants to their countries / hometowns once they have left tends to make a big difference. In fact the World Bank noted that migrant remittance inflows to Nigeria from Nigerians abroad constituted 4.5 percent of the country's entire GDP in 2011, which in raw figures amounted to over 11 billion U.S. dollars.

Already aware of the impact of remittances even as early as 1972, the first Ogbomosho volunteer chapter was formed in New York City that year. The following year, in 1973, another chapter was formed by Ogbomosho natives living in Washington, D.C. with the same goal of pooling their resources together in order to help develop the city they left behind. To date, several local chapters have been formed in many U.S. cities / states, including, Miami, FL; Dallas and Houston, TX; Atlanta, GA; Missouri; Boston, MA; Chicago, IL, and even in Toronto, Canada. These chapters have their own presidents and executives to help to coordinate meetings and donations.

According to R.K. Udo (1983), the formation of volunteer organizations by emigrants for the sole purpose of helping to develop a city or town, is not a new phenomenon among Nigerians. This has been going on for decades, among several ethnicities even internally, within Nigeria, when people started to leave their hometowns or villages for larger cities, to find work.

However, in 1996, the various Ogbomosho chapters in North America decided to form an umbrella organization with the belief that, "collectively, we can, through the various member organizations contribute more to the goal of developing Ogbomosho land at a stronger and faster pace than individuals' efforts." The organization has a constitution and the OSDNA has its own President and executives who serve a 2-year term. Members pay dues that are then used in development projects. OSDNA currently has several hundred members.

Meetings and Projects of the OSDNA

The OSDNA usually meets once a year in a major U.S. or Canadian city for their main conference / convention, usually around Labor Day weekend.  Meetings include discussions on how to help develop the City of Ogbomosho, and which projects to sponsor. Major past projects include the installation of boreholes in various parts of Ogbomosho in order to provide potable drinking water for city residents. The organization also provides several full ride scholarships to students annually, and donations (computers, books, etc.) to the Ladoke Akintola University of Technology (LAUTECH) in Ogbomosho. Other projects include the donation of various items and equipment to the Ogbomosho Baptist Medical Center / Hospital, Motherless Children Home, Blind Center, and Leprosy Center.

References

External links
Ogbomosho Sons and Daughters in North America

Foreign charities operating in Nigeria
African culture in New York (state)
Black Canadian culture in Toronto
Human migration
Nigerian-American culture and history
Nigerian diaspora in North America
Ogbomosho
Organizations established in 1996
Diaspora organizations in the United States
Yoruba diaspora
Yoruba-American history
Yoruba American
Black Canadian organizations